Icebound is a 1924 American silent drama film directed by William C. deMille, produced and distributed by Paramount Pictures, and based on a 1923 Pulitzer Prize Broadway produced play of the same name by Owen Davis. This film production was made at Paramount's Astoria Studios in New York City. Actress Edna May Oliver returned to the role that she played in the Broadway version.

Plot
As described in a film magazine review, returned home following service in France during World War I, a disillusioned Ben Jordan colors the dull life of his New England town by indulging in various dissipations. He sets fire to a barn and, to avoid arrest, disappears. His stern old mother lies ill in bed in the home's sick room, attended by her physician, while greedy relatives wait in the parlor room waiting for her demise. After her death, the relatives react with horrorstricken surprise when the family lawyer reads the will and the self-sacrificing ward, Jane Crosby, is pronounced as the sole heiress. Jane sets out to reform Ben and falls in love with him. While he is first attracted to his vamp cousin Nettie Moore, Ben finally realizes that he loves Jane and all ends well.

Cast

Preservation
With no copies of Icebound located in any film archives, it is a lost film.

References

External links

Lobby card
Australian daybill long lobby poster
Lobby poster version without the tear
Lobby card with flip side shown

1924 films
American silent feature films
Lost American films
Films directed by William C. deMille
1924 drama films
Silent American drama films
American black-and-white films
American films based on plays
1924 lost films
Lost drama films
1920s American films